Blood in the Water (originally titled Pacific Standard Time) is a 2016 American thriller film directed by Ben Cummings and Orson Cummings, starring Willa Holland, Alex Russell, Miguel Gomez, David S. Lee and Charlbi Dean.

Cast
 Willa Holland as Veronica
 Alex Russell as Percy
 Miguel Gomez as Freedgood
 David S. Lee as Hector Cortez
 Charlbi Dean as Pheebee
 Stelio Savante as Marius Roos

Release
The film was released on 26 August 2016.

Reception
The Hollywood Reporter wrote that "What might sound on paper like a sexy thriller falls well short in execution, with a script that barely tries to convince us of its characters’ motivations and, when it tries, isn’t very successful."

Noel Murray of the Los Angeles Times wrote that "until the ending, the plot doesn’t really twist much; and the Cummings don’t do enough with how Veronica and Perry’s dim career prospects reflect life for too many college grads these days."

References

External links
 
 

American thriller films
2016 thriller films